Stearns Matthews is an American, New York-based cabaret singer, recording artist, director, teacher, and pianist. He has performed throughout the United States as well as the United Kingdom.

Training 
As a teenager, Matthews was a voice student of Linda Benanti (mother of Laura Benanti). He completed his undergraduate studies at Westminster Choir College. During his four years there, he sang in the Westminster Symphonic Choir and in ensemble and as a soloist with the esteemed Westminster Choir at such venues as Carnegie Hall, Riverside Church, NJPAC, and Spoleto Festival USA under the batons of Dr. Joseph Flummerfelt, Harry Bickett, David Robertson, and Dr. Joe Miller. He graduated from Westminster Choir College in 2008 with a BM in Music Theater.

Career 

Matthews made his Manhattan cabaret debut in 2008 at the historic club Don't Tell Mama. His subsequent NYC appearances have included The Duplex, The Laurie Beechman Theatre, Metropolitan Room, Feinstein's/54 Below, Jazz at Lincoln Center, and The Town Hall.

He won two Manhattan Association of Cabaret Awards in 2015 (Best Male Vocalist and LaMott Friedman Award for Best Recording). He was a MAC Award nominee in 2009 (Best Male Debut), 2011 (Best Male Vocalist), 2013 (Best Musical Comedy Performer), 2017 (Best Male Vocalist), and 2018 (LaMott Friedman Award for Best Recording).

His debut album, Spark, also won the 2015 Bistro Award for Outstanding Recording.

He has directed musicals in New York City, New Jersey, and Virginia. He also maintains a private vocal studio, with students ranging from beginners to experienced professionals.

Matthews is an active Unitarian Universalist musician, serving as Director of Music Ministries at the Morristown Unitarian Universalist Fellowship (MUUF) in Morristown, NJ. Previously, he has served as Assistant Music Director at the Unitarian Universalist Congregation at Montclair. He also teaches musical theatre students at the University of the Arts in Philadelphia.

Albums 
 Spark (2014)  Matthews' debut album, Spark, contains a mix of musical theater songs and Great American Songbook standards. Spark won the 2015 MAC Award for Best Recording as well as the 2015 Bistro Award for Outstanding Recording. It was produced by Paul Rolnick for Zevely Records, with music direction and arrangements by Christopher Denny.
 December Songs (2017)  In November 2017, Matthews recorded and produced the first-ever recording by a male singer of Maury Yeston's contemporary song cycle December Songs. Commissioned by Carnegie Hall for Andrea Marcovicci in 1991, many recordings existed of the piece, but none with a male singer.

Personal life 
Matthews was born in Hartford, Connecticut on June 23, 1984. His family moved in 1997 to Kinnelon, New Jersey where he graduated from Kinnelon High School. He graduated from Westminster Choir College in Princeton, New Jersey in 2008 with a BM in Music Theater. Matthews has served on the board of directors of the Manhattan Association of Cabarets since 2012. He currently resides in the greater New York City area.

Awards 
 2015 Lamott/Friedman MAC Award for Best Recording
 2015 MAC Award for Best Male Vocalist
 2015 Bistro Award for Outstanding Recording

References

External links 
 Stearns Matthews official website

1984 births
Living people
American cabaret performers
American male pianists
American musical theatre directors
People from Kinnelon, New Jersey
Unitarian Universalists
Westminster Choir College alumni
21st-century American pianists
21st-century American male musicians